BT Holstra Wevelgem is a basketball team based in Wevelgem, Belgium. From 1997 it played in the First Division, after it promoted from the second one. The team was long known as Power Wevelgem, as it was sponsored by the company Power Oil for 15 years. The club currently plays in the Division III.

References

Basketball teams in Belgium